Unalakleet Airport  is a state-owned public-use airport located one nautical mile (2 km) north of the central business district of Unalakleet, a city in the Nome Census Area of the U.S. state of Alaska.

Facilities and aircraft
It has two asphalt surfaced runways: 15/33 measuring 5,900 x 150 ft (1,798 x 46 m) and 8/26 measuring 1,900 x 75 ft (579 x 23 m).

Northern Air Cargo flies the largest airplanes to this location, with Boeing 737 service.

Airlines and destinations

Passenger

Cargo

Accidents and incidents
A Boeing 737-2x6X, operating as MarkAir flight 3087 from Anchorage, crashed 7.5 miles short of runway 14 on June 2, 1990, injuring four, one of them (a flight attendant) seriously. There were no passengers in the aircraft, which was destroyed. No one was killed in the incident.

References

External links
 FAA Alaska airport diagram (GIF)
 

Airports in the Nome Census Area, Alaska